The Producers Guild of America Awards were originally established in 1990 by the Producers Guild of America as the Golden Laurel Awards, created by PGA Treasurer Joel Freeman with the support of Guild President Leonard Stern, in order to honor the visionaries who produce and execute motion picture and television product. The ceremony has been hosted each year by celebrity host/presenters, including Nick Clooney, Michael Douglas, Robert Guillaume, James Earl Jones, Jack Lemmon, Shirley MacLaine, Garry Marshall, Walter Matthau, Ronald Reagan, Marlo Thomas, Grant Tinker, Ted Turner, and Karen S. Kramer among others.

Ceremonies

Producers of the Year Awards
* Denotes a film that also won a corresponding Academy Award

Film winners

Best Theatrical Motion Picture

 1989: Driving Miss Daisy *
by producers Lili Fini Zanuck and Richard D. Zanuck
 1990: Dances with Wolves *
by producers Jim Wilson and Kevin Costner
 1991: The Silence of the Lambs *
by producers Edward Saxon, Kenneth Utt, and Ron Bozman
 1992: The Crying Game
by producer Stephen Woolley
 1993: Schindler's List *
by producers Branko Lustig, Gerald R. Molen, and Steven Spielberg
 1994: Forrest Gump *
by producers Wendy Finerman, Charles Newirth, Steve Starkey, and Steve Tisch
 1995: Apollo 13
by producers Brian Grazer and Todd Hallowell
 1996: The English Patient *
by producer Saul Zaentz
 1997: Titanic *
by producers James Cameron and Jon Landau
 1998: Saving Private Ryan
by producers Steven Spielberg, Allison Lyon Segan, Bonnie Curtis, Ian Bryce, Mark Gordon, and Gary Levinsohn
 1999: American Beauty *
by producers Bruce Cohen and Dan Jinks
 2000: Gladiator *
by producers Branko Lustig and Douglas Wick
 2001: Moulin Rouge!
by producers Fred Baron, Martin Brown, and Baz Luhrmann
 2002: Chicago *
by producers Martin Richards
 2003: The Lord of the Rings: The Return of the King *
by producers Peter Jackson, Barrie M. Osborne, and Fran Walsh
 2004: The Aviator
by producers Graham King and Michael Mann
 2005: Brokeback Mountain
by producers Diana Ossana and James Schamus
 2006: Little Miss Sunshine
by producers Albert Berger, David T. Friendly, Peter Saraf, Marc Turtletaub, and Ron Yerxa
 2007: No Country for Old Men *
by producers Scott Rudin, Joel Coen, and Ethan Coen
 2008: Slumdog Millionaire *
by producer Christian Colson
 2009: The Hurt Locker *
by producers Kathryn Bigelow, Mark Boal, Nicolas Chartier, and Greg Shapiro
 2010: The King's Speech *
by producers Iain Canning, Emile Sherman, and Gareth Unwin
 2011: The Artist *
by producer Thomas Langmann
 2012: Argo *
by producers Grant Heslov, Ben Affleck, and George Clooney
 2013: 12 Years a Slave * (TIE)
by producers Anthony Katagas, Jeremy Kleiner, Steve McQueen, Brad Pitt, and Dede Gardner

Gravity (TIE)by producers Alfonso Cuarón and David Heyman
 2014: Birdman *by producers Alejandro G. Iñárritu, John Lesher, and James W. Skotchdopole
 2015: The Big Short
by producers Brad Pitt, Dede Gardner, and Jeremy Kleiner
 2016: La La Land
by producers Fred Berger, Jordan Horowitz, and Marc Platt
 2017: The Shape of Water *
by producers Guillermo del Toro and J. Miles Dale
 2018: Green Book *
by producers Jim Burke, Charles B. Wessler, Brian Hayes Currie, Peter Farrelly and Nick Vallelonga
 2019: 1917
by producers Sam Mendes, Pippa Harris, Jayne-Ann Tenggren and Callum McDougall
 2020: Nomadland *
by producers Frances McDormand, Peter Spears, Mollye Asher, Dan Jenvey, Chloé Zhao
 2021: CODA * 
by producers Philippe Rousselet, Fabrice Gianfermi, Patrick Wachsberger
 2022: Everything Everywhere All at Once *
by producers Jonathan Wang, Dan Kwan, and Daniel ScheinertBest Animated Motion Picture

 2005: Wallace & Gromit: The Curse of the Were-Rabbit *by producers Claire Jennings and Nick Park
 2006: Carsby producer Darla K. Anderson
 2007: Ratatouille *by producer Brad Lewis
 2008: WALL-E *by producer Jim Morris
 2009:  Up *by producer Jonas Rivera
 2010: Toy Story 3 *by producer Darla K. Anderson
 2011:  The Adventures of Tintinby producers Peter Jackson, Steven Spielberg, and Kathleen Kennedy
 2012: Wreck-It Ralphby producer Clark Spencer
 2013: Frozen *by producer Peter Del Vecho
 2014: The Lego Movieby producer Dan Lin
 2015: Inside Out *by producer Jonas Rivera
 2016: Zootopia *by producer Clark Spencer
 2017: Coco *by producer Darla K. Anderson
 2018: Spider-Man: Into the Spider-Verse *by producers Avi Arad, Amy Pascal, Phil Lord and Christopher Miller
 2019: Toy Story 4 *by producers Mark Nielsen, and Jonas Rivera
 2020: Soul *by producer Dana Murray
 2021: Encanto *by producers Yvett Merino and Clark Spencer
 2022: Guillermo del Toro's Pinocchio *by producers Guillermo Del Toro, Gary Ungar, and Alex Bulkley

Stanley Kramer Award
Since 2002, this award has been given for films that "illuminate provocative social issues"
 2002: I Am Samby producers Jessie Nelson, Barbara Hall, Edward Zwick, Marshall Herskovitz, and Richard Solomon
 2003: Antwone Fisherby producers Todd Black, Randa Haines, and Denzel Washington
 2004: In Americaby producers Jim Sheridan and Arthur Lappin
 2005: Hotel Rwanda (TIE)by producer Terry GeorgeVoces inocentes (Innocent Voices) (TIE)by producer Lawrence Bender
 2006: Good Night, and Good Luck.by producer Grant Heslov
 2007: An Inconvenient Truthby producers Lawrence Bender, Scott Z. Burns, and Laurie David
 2008: The Great Debatersby producers Todd Black, Kate Forte, Joe Roth, and Oprah Winfrey
 2009: Milkby producers Dan Jinks and Bruce Cohen
 2010: Preciousby producers Lee Daniels, Sarah Siegel-Magness, and Gary Magness
 2011: Sean Pennfirst person to receive a Stanley Kramer Award
 2012: In the Land of Blood and Honeyby producers Angelina Jolie, Graham King, and Timothy Headington
 2013: Bully (2011, released in the US in 2012)
by producers Cynthia Lowen, Lee Hirsch, and Cindy Waitt
 2014: Fruitvale Stationby producers Forest Whitaker and Nina Yang Bongiovi
 2015: The Normal Heartby producers Scott Ferguson and Alexis Martin Woodall
 2016: The Hunting Groundby producer Amy Ziering
 2017: Lovingby producers Ged Doherty, Colin Firth, et al.
 2018: Get Outby producers Sean McKittrick, Jason Blum, Edward H. Hamm Jr., and Jordan Peele
 2019: Bombshell'''
by producers Aaron L. Glibert, Jay Roach, et al.

Television winners

Best Episodic Comedy

Best Episodic Drama

Best Long-Form Television

Best Limited Series Television

Best Streamed or Televised Movie

External links
 Official PGA website
 TheHollywoodReporter: 2008 Nominees